Nadia Khan Show is a talk show on Pakistan's Geo Entertainment, started in 2006 and hosted by presenter and producer Nadia Khan.

Overview
The show aired on Geo Entertainment. It originally ran as a morning show from 2006 to 2010, then returned in 2012, as a nighttime talk show. On 24 May 2013 it was announced on Facebook official page that the show had ended. Khan's morning show revived in November 2015 on Geo Entertainment, after a gap of two years once Bushra Ansari's morning show Utho Geo Pakistan ended after a run of a month due to her prior commitments.

Seasons
The first season was a morning show for about four years, and the programme became the first Urdu entertainment show to ever get a huge rating in Pakistan. After a one-year break and various reruns on Geo Tv, NKS returned on GEO TV for Season 2 on 31 September 2012.

Season 1
1st Season of the show premiered on 14 November 2006 from the Network’s Dubai Studios. The shows airs (Mon-Sat) from 9am-11am.

The show featured interviews with celebrities, subject matter experts and members of the public.(Mondays, Wednesdays and Fridays). Interviews included Fawad Khan, Iman Ali, Atif Aslam, Rahat Fateh Ali Khan, Shahid Afridi, Imran Khan, Bobby Deol, Farida Jalal, and Saroj Khan.

The Magazine Edition was a mix of different segments on celebrity lifestyles, beauty tips, child care, entertaining talent shows and many exciting prizes (Tuesday and Thursday). On 22 July 2010, a talent hunt was also done by the show called the 'This Is It' campaign,a nationwide hunt for Pakistan's next top model. There was a short list of 45 candidates out of 150 finalists that were chosen from 12,000 profiles. Shaharzad Askari and Touseef were the winners of campaign.

Season 2
In season two, the show continued to cover a variety of topics. In addition, the audience was polled on the subjects covered. In its second season, 28 episodes were aired on Geo TV.

Season 3
Geo Tv has picked up Nadia Khan Show again for a third season. It commenced in February 2013; broadcast on Friday and Saturday in the 6-8pm slot as an evening live show with an exciting, entertaining and informative format on 2 Feb 2013, with a new look and feel.
 
Segments

Nadia Khan Diary
NKS jockey Wid Zeeshan
Cheap Boss
Whatz up
NKS Helpline
Guest corner

Episodes

Season 2 Episodes

Awards and recognition
Nadia Khan won the Masala Tv Awards For Best TV Presenter for her performance in this show.

Masala Lifestyle Awards
Winner
2008: Best TV Presenter; Nadia Khan Show
2009: Best TV Presenter; Nadia Khan Show

References

External links 

Pakistani television talk shows
Urdu-language television shows
Pakistani television series
Geo TV original programming